Virgo World is the debut studio album by American rapper Lil Tecca. It was released through Galactic and Republic Records on September 18, 2020. The album features guest appearances from Polo G, Lil Durk, Nav, Skrillex, DJ Scheme, Lil Uzi Vert, Guwop Reign, and Tecca's record label Internet Money. It follows his debut mixtape and project, We Love You Tecca, which was released in 2019. The album title comes from Tecca's astrological sign, Virgo, as he was born on August 26, 2002.

The album debuted at number ten on the US Billboard 200 with 35,000 sales in its first week, and debuted at number six on the Canadian Albums Chart. It received generally positive reviews.

Background 
The album's title comes from Lil Tecca's astrological sign, Virgo, being born on August 26, 2002. It is believed that Virgos are logical and persistent, but sometimes feel shy and overly critical. Virgos are born any time from August 23 to September 22. The rapper had been teasing it for over a year prior to its release, posting snippets of a few songs. On September 4, 2020, it was speculated that it would be released soon.

Singles
The album's lead single, "Out of Love", featuring Lil Tecca's record label Internet Money, was released on April 17, 2020. The second single, "Royal Rumble", was released on his 18th birthday, August 26, 2020. The third and final pre-release single, "Our Time", was released on September 11, 2020, and introduced as the intro to the album. "Dolly", a collaboration with fellow American rapper Lil Uzi Vert, was released along with the album as its fourth and final single, on September 18, 2020.

Commercial performance 
Virgo World debuted at number ten on the US Billboard 200 with 35,000 sales in its first week, falling behind his debut mixtape and project, We Love You Tecca, which debuted at number four in the previous year. It debuted at number six on the Canadian Albums Chart. It also charted in Australia, Belgium, the Netherlands, Ireland, and the United Kingdom.

Critical reception

Writing for Def Pen, Ryan Shepard offered a positive review, going on to opine that "he has shown and proved that he is looking to stay in this industry". On a mixed review of the album, Alphonse Pierre of Pitchfork expressed his confusion with the clear meaning of the lyrics and that "a pocketful of catchy melodies and bubbly rhythms don't make up for a lack of anything interesting to say." Alex Zidel of HotNewHipHop gave a neutral review, explaining that "while his move to island-based production adds to some much-needed substance of Lil Tecca, it fails to come across as an authentic."

Track listing 

Notes
  signifies an additional producer

Personnel

Performers

 Lil Tecca – primary artist 
 Polo G – primary artist 
 Lil Durk – featured artist 
 Nav – featured artist 
 Skrillex – primary artist 
 DJ Scheme – primary artist 
 Lil Uzi Vert – primary artist 
 Guwop Reign – featured artist 
 Internet Money – featured artist 

Technical

 Alex Tumay – mixing, studio personnel 
 Chris Gehringer – mastering, studio personnel 
 Rex Kudo – keyboards , programming , engineering , studio personnel 
 Menoh Beats – engineering, programming, studio personnel 
 Blake Slatkin – engineering, studio personnel 
 Edgar Herrera – mixing, studio personnel 
 Jayron Beats – programming 
 CassellBeats – programming 
 Deemarc – programming 
 Sevn Thomas – programming 
 Leon Thomas – programming 
 Mike Hector – programming 
 Rowan – programming 
 OnlyKND – programming 
 Sean Turk – programming 
 Z3N – programming 
 Taz Taylor – programming 
 Census – programming 
 Rio Leyva – programming 
 Repko – programming 
 Spaceman – programming 
 Skrillex – programming 
 DJ Scheme – programming 
 Nuri – programming 
 Tommy Brown – programming 
 Ambezza – programming 
 ProdByXavi – programming 
 TxbiTheTeenvger – programming 
 Nick Mira – programming 
 Sam Wish – programming 
 Blake Slatkin – programming 
 Kid Culture – programming 
 Blk – programming 
 Chek Beatz – programming 
 Evertime – programming 
 Tobi Aitch – programming 
 Cxdy – programming 
 FrankieOnTheGuitar – programming 
 BeatsByTrav – programming 
 MJ Nichols – programming 
 Saint Luca – programming

Charts

References 

2020 albums
Lil Tecca albums